The bizarre-nosed chameleon (Calumma hafahafa) is a species of chameleon endemic to Madagascar. Its scientific name was named after the Malagasy word hafahafa, which means "bizarre" or "strange" (a reference to the species' unusually upturned rostral appendages).

Distribution and habitat
Although the true extent of the bizarre-nosed chameleon's range is not known, it is estimated to less than 100 square kilometers. Specimens have been taken from several locations in northeastern Madagascar, all at relatively high altitude. It appears the species lives only in montane humid forests.

Description
The primary distinguishing characteristic of the bizarre-nosed chameleon is the single large rostral ("nose") appendage appearing on the males. Otherwise it is quite similar to Calumma malthe and Calumma peltieriorum. It has around 18 gular spines as well.

Conservation and threats
Mostly due to its extremely small range and ongoing habitat loss, the bizarre-nosed chameleon is ranked as critically endangered by the International Union for Conservation of Nature. Its population is probably declining, and conservation action is necessary to prevent extinction.

References

Calumma
Endemic fauna of Madagascar
chameleon
chameleon
Reptiles described in 2006
Taxa named by Christopher John Raxworthy
Taxa named by Ronald Archie Nussbaum